Kathy Kiera Clarke (possibly Keira) is a Northern Irish actress. She is best known for her role as Aunt Sarah in Derry Girls.

Career

Film and television
Clarke's first television role was as Bernadette Brennan in Head over Heels in 1993. In 1995, she appeared in an episode of Chandler & Co as Poppy Farquhar. She appeared as Rosemary in the 1996 film Eskimo Day.

In 2000, she played Rosie in the film The Most Fertile Man in Ireland and a production assistant in the film Wild About Harry. She also played Anna Le Page in the television series, Take a Girl Like You. In 2002, Clarke played Frances in Bloody Sunday. In 2003, she played Nicola Blyth in the film Solid Air.

In 2004, Clarke appeared as Una in the comedy series Pulling Moves. She played Elizabeth Gibson in the film Omagh and played Jenifer Gaghan in two episodes of Silent Witness. In 2005, she played Sinead in four episodes of Proof. In 2006, she played Agnes in the film Small Engine Repair. In 2009, she played Emma in the film Cherrybomb.

In 2013, she played Marlene Riley in The Ice Cream Girls. In 2017, she played Varvara in the film Bitter Harvest. Since 2018, Clarke has played the role of Aunt Sarah in the Channel 4 sitcom Derry Girls written by Lisa McGee.

In 2020, Clarke played the role of Sybil Stamfordis in the BBC One miniseries, The Pale Horse. Ann Donahue, writing for IndieWire, said that Clark's "portrayal of witch Sybil is a fun triple-take-inducing switch from her work as the ditzy aunt on Derry Girls."

In 2021, Clarke played the role of Claire Keenan in Bloodlands.

Stage
Clarke has also appeared on stage and has appeared in shows such as Brilliant Traces, Low Level Panic, The Coronation Voyage, Woman and Scarecrow, Scarborough, God of Carnage, Macbeth, Primecut, The Recruiting Office, Heartbreak House, Hamlet, Pentecost, Spokesong, The Bonefire, Dream of Autumn, Attempts on her Life, Don Carlos, Roberto Zucco, Shining City, Faith Healer, Lagan, Borders of Paradise, Torquato Tasso, Once a Catholic, The Factory Girls, Jekyll and Hyde, Riders to the Sea, Damaged Goods, Summit Conference, Medea, Stormont: a Farce and An Oak Tree.

Filmography

Personal life 
Clarke lives near Hampstead Heath, Primrose Hill and Regent's Park. She is a fan of the Buddhist teacher Tara Brach.

References

External links

Irish stage actresses
Irish television actresses
Film actresses from Northern Ireland
Living people
Stage actresses from Northern Ireland
Actresses from Belfast
Television actresses from Northern Ireland
Year of birth missing (living people)
21st-century Irish actresses
20th-century Irish actresses